Razia Sultan was an Indian period drama serial which aired on &TV from 6 March 2015. The main role of empress Razia Sultana was played by Pankhuri Awasthy Rode. The serial is about Razia Sultan (Sultan Razia), the only female ruler of the Delhi Sultanate. It talks about a young lady and her dilemmas with everyday life. The serial was introduced by Shah Rukh Khan as Sutradhar. The song titled Mere Maula of the serial was sung by Supriya Joshi.

Plot

The show focuses on the life of Razia Sultan. She was made the ruler by Sultan Iltutmish himself. In spite of having many sons, he felt that Razia would make a more capable ruler. The show later focuses on 13th century India and Razia's struggles and dilemmas as a Sultan, and as a woman in daily life.

Shahzaadi Razia plans to give her father, Sultan Altamash (Iltutmish) a reminder of his past as his gift for Eid. She visits the Sultan's old employer, Nizam, where she meets Nizam's slave, Fatima. Nizam dies before he can free Fatima from her slavery, which is why Fatima must be buried with him. Razia saves Fatima and Fatima becomes her new helper.

Shah Turkan, Sultan Altamash's courtesan from Lahore, is shown to have come to celebrate Eid with the Sultan with their son, Rukn Uddin Firoz. Shah Turkan is a manipulative lady who wants to see her son as Sultan-e-Hind, heir to the throne, and will stop at nothing to do so. Rukn Uddin is an arrogant brat who likes to humiliate and torture people at will. Razia has a clash with Rukn Uddin in the public market, thereby leading to enmity between them.

The celebrations for Eid have begun. Both, Qutb Begum (Sultan's wife and Razia, Shazia and Naasir's mother) and Shah Turkan vie for Sultan's attention, as the person who Sultan will spend the Eid with has the first right on Eidi, a gift given by the Sultan to his family. Qutb Begum asks Razia to ask Sultan to spend the Eid with them, but Razia asks for Fatima's life instead, much to Qutb Begum and Shamshad Begum's (Qutb Begum's mother, wife of former Sultan Qutb Uddin Aibak) dismay.

They wanted to ask for the Subedaari (military and political charge of a region, stepping stone to becoming heir of the Sultan's throne) of Delhi to be given to Shehzaadah Naasir, Sultan's first son with Qutb Begum as he is most deserving. But Sultan decides to spend the Eid with Shah Turkan, giving her the chance to ask for Rukn Uddin's Subedaari as the Eidi. Razia foils Shah Turkan's plans as she invites the King of Ghazni, Taj Al-din Sultan Yaldoz, Sultan's friend and Naasir's teacher to Delhi for Eid. Sultan Altamash is now forced to spend Eid with his Royal family, pleasing Razia's mother.

Qutb Begum and Shah Turkan both ask for the Subedaari of Delhi for their respective sons at the same time during the Eid celebration, to which Sultan responds by organizing a competition for all the capable men to fight for the Subedaari, giving an equal chance to everybody. Qutb Begum has no qualms but Shah Turkan is afraid Rukn Uddin will lose.

Elsewhere, a man named Mirza Altunia (Malik Ikhtyaar Uddin Altunia), is shown to be roaming carefree around Delhi with his friend, Zaaroon. He is philosophical, carefree and an overconfident youth looking for ways to entertain himself.  He goes to the Dargah to get his favourite perfume, where Razia also comes to pray for her brother's success in the competition. Her prayer bespoken and perfumed handkerchief falls in Mirza's hand, who keeps it with him as it has his perfume on it. He hears of the competition and decides to take part in it too.

Shah Turkan sabotages Naasir's riding equipment, which causes him to fall during the fight, leading to his defeat, much to the dismay of the Royal family. Rukn Uddin is the only one left in the competition. Just before he is declared the winner, Mirza enters fray and defeats him, becoming the Subedaar of Delhi. He doesn't stop to claim his prize and is shown to have returned to where he came from. He does this because he had realised that Rukn Uddin was unfit to be the Subedaar and that he had cheated during the competition. Meanwhile, Razia celebrates the fact that Rukn Uddin won't be the Subedaar and that Naasir still stands a chance.

Mirza is shown to be a slave to a quarry and forgery owner, whose horse and armour Mizra had stolen for the fight. The owner is shown to be an unjust and ruthless man, who kills another slave just because he stole some food. Mirza sees this and becomes furious, and kills his master in anger, which is considered a grave sin in Delhi. He flees the scene with Zaaroon and decides to leave Delhi.

Shah Turkan accidentally hints Razia that she sabotaged Naasir's riding equipment, resulting in his defeat. Razia decides to figure it out by looking for the damaged saddle. But Shah Turkan and Rukn Uddin get ahead of her and cause misunderstandings between Sultan and Naasir. Naasir, in anger, leaves the palace for Multan, his uncle's kingdom, along with his mother and grandmother. Razia decides to stay back and convince her father to forgive Naasir. Later she decides to go to Multan to convince her brother to return. Rana Maartand, Sultan's aide and trusted military commander accompanies her. Meanwhile, Shah Turkan conspired to send her men amongst the ranks of Razia's guard. When Razia arrived at Multan, all the soldiers except Rana Maartand fought with Naasir, causing him to believe that the Sultan wants war. He slays Rana Martand in the fight that ensued due to a misunderstanding. The corpses of Rana Martand and other soldiers are sent to the Sultan, leading him to believe that Naasir wants war. Both sides have begun to prepare for war, but Razia wants to stop it at any cost. She decides to go to Ghazni alone to seek Sultan Yaldoz's help as he is both a friend of the Sultan and a mentor to Naasir. She prepares to leave with her servant Chanda while Fatima stays back to keep Razia updated and to try to keep the situation under control. Her family in Multan believes that Razia has left for Delhi, while the Sultan believes her to still be in Multan.

Mirza plans to depart for Ghazni and decides to meet his childhood companions for one last time. He is shown to be a former student of Haaji Jamaal, an assassin who trains young boys to murder for money. Mirza too received this training, making him proficient in the usage of arms and warfare. But Haaji Jamaal desires for Mirza to be killed, as he didn't like that Mirza left them and didn't become and assassin himself, and Haaji also fears that Mirza will leak the secrets of his society to others. Haaji declares Mirza as his best student, sparking jealousy in 2 of his students, who decide to kill Mirza for the title.

Razia begins her journey and on her way finds many obstacles. She sees some young girls in cages and men carrying them somewhere. She decides to free the girls, but gets herself captured in the process. She then goes with the men to Mandi Kabraan, where young girls and women are bought and sold to become prostitutes, courtesans and slaves. Razia decides to free herself and the other girls there from this enslavement.

Cast
 Pankhuri Awasthy Rode as Razia Sultan
 Rohit Purohit as Ikhtiyar ud-din Malik Altunia 
 Saurabh Pandey as Jamal-ud-Din Yaqut
 Sooraj Thapar as Shams-ud-din Iltutmish
 Khalida Turi as Qutub Begum
 Mohit Abrol as Nasiruddin Mahmud
 Seema Kapoor as Shamshad Begum (Valide Sultan)
 Sambhavna Seth as Shah Turkan
 Ankit Arora as Rukn-ud-din Firuz
 Puja Banerjee as Yasmine-Rukn-ud-din Firuz's wife and Ala ud din Mausad's mother.
 Zara Barring as Shazia Begum (New Shazia)  
Dalip Tahil as Maroosh
 Manish Khanna as Taj al-Din Yildiz
 Bhavna Chauhan as Shazia Begum (Old Shazia) 
 Praneet Bhat as Kasabi Kalandar Lahori / Shagird
 Riya Deepsi as Fatima / Fatima Begum (Validah Sultan)   
 Himangini Singh Yadu as Uzma Begum (Old Uzma) 
 Jaswinder Gardner as Uzma Begum (New Uzma)
 Swati Anand as Nadira Begum
 Eijaz Khan as Muiz ud din Bahram
 Mandar Jadhav as Iqbal Khan (Tafal Sultan)
 Baizad Khan as Nasir ad-Din Qabacha
 Anil Rastogi as Nizamuddin
Dhruvee Haldankar as Hippie
 Rishima Sidhu as Kaneez of Shah Turkan
 Vikram Mastal (Sharma) as Bilal Khan

References

External links
 

Indian television series
Hindi-language television shows
2015 Indian television series debuts
2015 Indian television series endings
&TV original programming
Indian historical television series
Cultural depictions of Razia Sultan
Television series set in the 13th century
Television series about Islam
Indian period television series
Swastik Productions television series